
Gmina Sławoborze is a rural gmina (administrative district) in Świdwin County, West Pomeranian Voivodeship, in north-western Poland.

Villages
Gmina Sławoborze contains the villages and settlements of Biały Zdrój, Ciechnowo, Drzeń, Jastrzębniki, Kalina, Krzecko, Krzesimowo, Lepino, Miedzno, Międzyrzecko, Międzyrzecze, Mysłowice, Nowe Ślepce, Pomorce, Poradz, Powalice, Pustowo, Rokosowo, Sidłowo, Sławkowo, Sławoborze, Słowenkowo, Słowieńsko, Sobiemirowo, Stare Ślepce, Trzciana and Zagrody.

Neighbouring gminas
Gmina Sławoborze is bordered by the gminas of Białogard, Gościno, Karlino, Rąbino, Resko, Rymań and Świdwin.

References
Polish official population figures 2006

Slawoborze
Świdwin County